Zsolt Szeglet (born 4 May 1977 in Keszthely, Zala) is a Hungarian athlete specializing in the 400 metres.

Professional career 
He finished fifth at the 2002 European Championships in Athletics, and participated in the Olympic Games in 2000 and 2004. Szeglet finished seventh with the Hungarian 4 x 100 metres relay team, which consisted of Viktor Kovács, Gábor Dobos, Roland Németh and Szeglet, at the 1999 World Championships.

His personal best time over 400 m is 45.43 seconds, achieved in May 2001 in College Station.

External links
 At one point he also wished to play for "Nottingham Forest Football Club
 
 
 

1977 births
Living people
Hungarian male sprinters
Athletes (track and field) at the 2000 Summer Olympics
Athletes (track and field) at the 2004 Summer Olympics
Olympic athletes of Hungary
Sportspeople from Keszthely